Lapteva Island is the island lying 1 km off the north coast of Anvers Island in the Palmer Archipelago, Antarctica.  The feature extends 900 m in north-south direction and 880 m in east-west direction.

The island is named after Gergana Lapteva, geologist at St. Kliment Ohridski base in 2006/07 and subsequent seasons.

Location
British mapping in 1980.

Maps
British Antarctic Territory.  Scale 1:200000 topographic map.  DOS 610 Series, Sheet W 64 62.  Directorate of Overseas Surveys, UK, 1980.
 Antarctic Digital Database (ADD). Scale 1:250000 topographic map of Antarctica. Scientific Committee on Antarctic Research (SCAR). Since 1993, regularly upgraded and updated.

References
 Bulgarian Antarctic Gazetteer. Antarctic Place-names Commission. (details in Bulgarian, basic data in English)
Lapteva Island. SCAR Composite Antarctic Gazetteer.

External links
 Lapteva Island. Copernix satellite image

Islands of the Palmer Archipelago
Bulgaria and the Antarctic